The History of David Grieve is a novel by Mary Augusta Ward, first published in 1892.

Further reading

 "The History of David Grieve," The Bookman, 1892, p. 183.
 "The History of David Grieve," Current Literature, Vol. IX, No. 3, pp. 456–458.
 "New Books," Californian Illustrated Magazine, Vol. I, No. 5, 1892, pp. 513–514.
 "Mrs. Ward New Novel," The Book Buyer, Vol. IX, No. 2, 1892, pp. 56–61.
 "Talk About New Books," The Catholic World, Vol. LIV, 1892, pp. 918–922.
 Adams, Francis (July 1892). "Some Recent Novels," The Fortnightly Review, Vol. LVIII, pp. 13–22.
 Collister, Peter (1985). "The Heritage of George Sand: Mrs Humphry Ward's The History of David Grieve," Review of English Studies, Vol. 36, No. 144, pp. 501–521.
 Collister, Peter (1989). "Some Literary and Popular Sources for Mrs Humphry Ward's The History of David Grieve," The Review of English Studies, Vol. 40, No. 158, pp. 215–231; Concluded, Vol. 40, No. 159, pp. 373–385.
 Copeland, Charles Townsend (1892). "Recent American and English Fiction," The Atlantic Monthly, Vol. LXIX, pp. 704–705.
 Copeland, Charles Townsend (1892). "George Eliot and Mrs Humphry Ward," The North American Review, Vol. 154, pp. 503–505.
 Hind, Robert (1892). "David Grieve: A Study in Natural Religion," Primitive Methodist Quarterly Review and Christian Ambassador, Vol. 14, No. 3, pp. 699–715.
 Olcott, Charles S. (1909). "Mrs. Humphry Ward's Real People," The Outlook, Vol. 93, pp. 407–415.
 Oliphant, Margaret (1892). "The Old Saloon," The Blackwood's Magazine, Vol. CLI, pp. 455–474.
 Ward, Mary A. (1905). "Preface" to The History of David Grieve. New York: The Macmillan Company, pp. vii–xvii.
 Wedgwood, Julia (1892). "Fiction and Faith," The Contemporary Review, Vol. LXII, pp. 217–224.

External links
 Mrs. Ward Make Reply
 The History of David Grieve, at Project Gutenberg
 The History of David Grieve, Vol. II, Vol. III, at Internet Archive

Victorian novels
1892 British novels
British philosophical novels
Novels by Mary Augusta Ward